The Locket may refer to:
The Locket (1946 film), an American film directed by John Brahm
The Locket (1970 film), a Spanish film directed by Rafael Gil
The Locket (2002 film), an American television film directed by Karen Arthur
"The Locket" (Dynasty), a television episode
"The Locket" (Farscape), a television episode
"The Locket" (How I Met Your Mother), a television episode
The Locket, a 1998 novel by Richard Paul Evans

See also
Locket (disambiguation)